Tri-Lakes is an unincorporated community and census-designated place in Thorncreek and Smith townships in Whitley County, Indiana, United States.

Geography
Tri-Lakes settlement is located on land surrounding Big Cedar Lake, Little Cedar Lake, Round Lake, and Shriner Lake.

Demographics

External links
 Tri-Lakes CDP, Indiana

References

Unincorporated communities in Whitley County, Indiana
Unincorporated communities in Indiana
Fort Wayne, IN Metropolitan Statistical Area